

Premise
Foofa a pink flower bubble on the series Yo Gabba Gabba.